Marcel Cheron (born 10 August 1957 in Ittre) is a Belgian politician and a member of Ecolo. He has an MA in History from the Université catholique de Louvain. He was elected to the Walloon Parliament in 1991 and became automatically a member of the Parliament of the French Community at the same time. He was a member of the Belgian Senate from 1999 until 2005. He was re-elected as a member of the Belgian Senate in 2007.

Since 11 May 2003, he is an Officer in the Order of Leopold.

Notes

External links
Biography at the Belgian Senate website

1957 births
Living people
Ecolo politicians
Members of the Parliament of the French Community
Members of the Senate (Belgium)
Members of the Parliament of Wallonia
People from Ittre
21st-century Belgian politicians